A by-election for the constituency of Leeds West in the United Kingdom House of Commons was held on 21 July 1949, caused by the suicide of the incumbent Labour MP Thomas Stamford. The result was a hold for the Labour Party, with their candidate Charles Pannell.

Result

Previous election

References

 Craig, F. W. S. (1983) [1969]. British parliamentary election results 1918-1949 (3rd edition ed.). Chichester: Parliamentary Research Services. . 
 

West, 1949
Leeds West by-election
Leeds West by-election
West by-election, 1949
Leeds West by-election